Khaled Kemas (born 1 September 1979) is a retired French-born Algerian professional footballer who played as a striker.

Club career
Kemas was born in Créteil, France.

He played on the professional level in the Scottish Premier League for Dundee and Motherwell. For both clubs he scored on his debut; at Dundee he scored on his debut in a defeat to future club Motherwell, and then at Motherwell he scored on his debut in a defeat to Livingston.

On 11 July 2010, Kemas signed a two-year contract with MC Alger. However, he was released from the club the following month after failing to convince head coach Alain Michel of his abilities.

References

External links
 
 

1979 births
Living people
Sportspeople from Créteil
Association football forwards
Algerian footballers
Algerian expatriate footballers
Expatriate footballers in France
Expatriate footballers in Scotland
Dundee F.C. players
Motherwell F.C. players
Red Star F.C. players
Scottish Premier League players
UJA Maccabi Paris Métropole players
MC Alger players
Algerian expatriate sportspeople in Scotland
Algeria under-23 international footballers
US Ivry players
FC Les Lilas players
Sainte-Geneviève Sports players
21st-century Algerian people
Footballers from Val-de-Marne